Les Tuche may refer to:

Les Tuche, 2011 film
Les Tuche 2: Le Rêve américain, 2016 film
Les Tuche 3 or The Magic Tuche, 2018 film